The Vietnam Museum of Ethnology is a museum in Hanoi, Vietnam, which focuses on the 54 officially recognised ethnic groups in Vietnam. It is located on a  property  in the Cầu Giấy District, about 8 km from the city center. The Museum is a member of the Vietnam Academy of Social Sciences - an academic institution of the Vietnamese Government.

A second exhibition building was open in 2013 and has a focus on Southeast Asian cultures and peoples.

History 

The proposal for the museum was officially approved on 14 December 1987. Construction lasted from 1987 to 1995, and it was opened to the public on 12 November 1997. The budget for construction of the museum was US$1.9 million, with an additional US$285,000 allocated for acquisition of artifacts.

The exhibition building was designed by the architect Ha Duc Linh, a member of the Tày ethnic group, in the shape of a Đông Sơn drum, and the interior architecture was designed by the French architect Véronique Dollfus.

The second exhibition building focusing on Southeast Asian ethnology was designed in a kite shape and was open in 2013.

Literature

References

External links

 Vietnam Museum of Ethnology - official site
 Vietnam Museum of Ethnology - An introduction of the Vietnamese Museum of Ethnology.

Museums in Hanoi
 
Ethnographic museums in Asia